The Kangan Line, also spelled Kang'an Line, is a non-electrified standard-gauge freight-only secondary line of the Korean State Railway located entirely within Sinŭiju-si, North P'yŏngan Province, North Korea, running from Sinŭiju on the P'yŏngŭi Line to Kang'an.

History
For the original line's history and other information prior to 1945, see Gyeongui Line (1904–1945).

In 1911, the Yalu River Railway Bridge was completed across the Yalu River between Sinŭiju and Andong (now Dandong), China, connecting the Kyŏngŭi Line to the Anfeng Line of the South Manchuria Railway. Work to convert the Anfeng Line from  narrow gauge to standard gauge was completed at the same time, thus connecting the capitals of Korea and China with a continuous railway line via and Manchuria. 

On 1 November 1935, Sentetsu opened Pinjŏng Station between Sinŭiju and Lower Sinŭiju stations, but closed it again on 15 November 1941. 

On 1 June 1936, Lower Sinŭiju station was renamed Sinŭiju Kang'an Station, and the  line from Sinŭiju Station to Sinŭiju Kang'an Station was detached from the Kyŏngŭi Line to become the Kang'an Line. 

Passenger service on the Kang'an Line was discontinued on 31 March 1943, with general (public) freight traffic being relocated from Sinŭiju Kang'an to Sinŭiju station on 20 December of that year.

Services

The Kang'an Line is used to serve the various industries in Sinŭiju, such as the Sinŭiju Streptomycin Factory and the Sinŭiju Chemical Fibre Complex (called the "Chōsen Paper Mills, Ltd." prior to 1945). There is also a large workshop for maintenance of passenger cars at Kang'an Station.

Route
A yellow background in the "Distance" box indicates that section of the line is not electrified.

References

Railway lines in North Korea
Standard gauge railways in North Korea
Railway lines opened in 1911